Todd Ridley (born 11 February 1969) is a former Australian rules footballer. He played mainly as a full forward. He is notable for kicking Fremantle Football Club's first goal in the AFL.

AFL career
During his seven years in the Australian Football League he played for three clubs, Essendon, Fremantle and Hawthorn. Injuries restricted him to only 48 games in this time. He played in Fremantle's inaugural game in the AFL on 1 April 1995 vs Richmond at the MCG and scored the team's first ever goal.

After he retired from the AFL he returned to the WAFL, but instead of returning to Claremont, where he had won the Simpson Medal in the Tiger's 1996 premiership, he instead switched to Subiaco. He won the Bernie Naylor Medal in 1998, his first year at Subiaco for kicking the most goals in the league.

He has also been a commentator for the ABC for WAFL games.

References

External links

1969 births
Living people
Fremantle Football Club players
Essendon Football Club players
Hawthorn Football Club players
Claremont Football Club players
Subiaco Football Club players
Australian rules footballers from Western Australia